Monoctenocera brachiella is a species of snout moth, and the type species in the genus Monoctenocera. It was described by George Hampson in 1898 and is known from India (including Sikkim and Kolkata).

References

Moths described in 1898
Anerastiini